West Fairlee is a town in Orange County, Vermont, United States. The population was 621 at the 2020 census.

History

Originally a part of the town of Fairlee, West Fairlee separated in 1797. The town was first settled by Nathaniel Niles that same year. The town remained predominantly agricultural until copper was discovered in nearby Vershire in 1813. With the opening of the Ely Copper Mine in 1821 the town rapidly began to grow. The mine became the site of Vermont's largest labor revolt, dubbed the 'Ely War,' in 1883. Unable to remain financially solvent the mine was sold to George Westinghouse. 

Combined with a fire that destroyed much of the town in 1910 and the mine's closure in 1920, West Fairlee's economy suffered immensely. Today the town is largely a bedroom community.

During the Civil War 98 residents served, 11% of the town’s population. Among them Medal of Honor recipient General Stephen Thomas (Medal of Honor). This included Company A of the 15th Vermont Infantry Regiment which was organized in West Fairlee in 1862. 

West Fairlee was the summer residence of Nobel-winning economist Milton Friedman, which he named “Capitaf.” It was here that he and his wife, Rose Friedman wrote the 1980 bestselling book, Free to Choose.

Portions of the 1983 film The Survivors starring Walter Mathau and Robin Williams was filmed in West Fairlee.

Landmarks
West Fairlee is home to two historic summer camps: Camp Billings and Aloha Horizons Camp.

West Fairlee Center Church

Asa May House

Geography
According to the United States Census Bureau, the town has a total area of 22.8 square miles (59.1 km2), of which 22.6 square miles (58.5 km2) is land and 0.2 square mile (0.6 km2) (0.96%) is water.  The Ompompanoosuc River flows through the southwestern part of the town.

Demographics

As of the census of 2000, there were 726 people, 278 households, and 197 families residing in the town.  The population density was 32.1 people per square mile (12.4/km2).  There were 340 housing units at an average density of 15.0 per square mile (5.8/km2).  The racial makeup of the town was 98.76% White, 0.14% African American, 0.55% Native American, 0.41% Asian, 0.14% from other races.

There were 278 households, out of which 36.3% had children under the age of 18 living with them, 56.8% were married couples living together, 7.9% had a female householder with no husband present, and 29.1% were non-families. 20.9% of all households were made up of individuals, and 5.4% had someone living alone who was 65 years of age or older.  The average household size was 2.61 and the average family size was 3.02.

In the town, the population was spread out, with 27.8% under the age of 18, 7.0% from 18 to 24, 32.4% from 25 to 44, 24.4% from 45 to 64, and 8.4% who were 65 years of age or older.  The median age was 35 years. For every 100 females, there were 102.8 males.  For every 100 females age 18 and over, there were 100.0 males.

The median income for a household in the town was $40,667, and the median income for a family was $42,500. Males had a median income of $27,200 versus $22,788 for females. The per capita income for the town was $18,011.  About 8.0% of families and 10.7% of the population were below the poverty line, including 16.1% of those under age 18 and 8.7% of those age 65 or over.

Notable people 

 Asa L. Baldwin, Wisconsin state assemblyman
 Chauncey C. Churchill
 Jabez William Clay, Founder of Phi Sigma Kappa fraternity.
 Eben Pomeroy Colton,  Lieutenant Governor of the State of Vermont from 1878 to 1880
 Milton Friedman, Nobel prize-winning economist in economics; owner of the summer estate named Capitaf (a portmanteau of "Capitalism" and "Freedom"), book from which he and his wife Rose Friedman were able to buy land and build from the proceeds. The book Free to Choose was written in West Fairlee during their summers spent at Capitaf. Capitaf continues to host private summer colloquia for students hailing from universities all around the United States
 Nathaniel Niles, US congressman
 Albert Southworth, photographer known for their daguerreotypes in the first half of the 19th century
 Stephen Thomas, recipient of the Medal of Honor for gallantry

References

External links
 
 Town of West Fairlee Website

 
Towns in Vermont
Towns in Orange County, Vermont